The 2011 Virginia Cavaliers football team represented the University of Virginia in the 2011 NCAA Division I FBS football season. The Cavaliers were led by second-year head coach Mike London and played their home games at Scott Stadium. They were members of the Coastal Division of the Atlantic Coast Conference (ACC). Virginia had an 8–5 overall record on the season with a 5–3 mark in the ACC play to finish in a tie for second place in the Coastal Division. The Cavaliers appeared in the AP Poll and the Coaches Poll for the first time since 2007. Memorable moments from the season include: upsetting #12-ranked and undefeated Georgia Tech and defeating Florida State in Tallahassee for the first time in school history. They also became the first team in NCAA history to win road games against the  Miami Hurricanes and the Florida State Seminoles in the same season. They were invited to the Chick-fil-A Bowl, where they were defeated by Auburn, 43–24.

Previous season
The Cavaliers went 4–8 in 2010, their third losing season in a row, and first under new head coach Mike London. Despite having an off-season recruiting class among the best in the country, a major upset versus the then #22 Miami Hurricanes, and a near-upset in the week two game versus the University of Southern California Trojans, the Cavaliers were plagued by penalties (ranked 117th out of 120 in the country) and turnovers, and finished 5th in the Atlantic Coast Conference's Coastal division. In the ACC Preseason Poll, they were picked to finish at next to last place in the ACC Coastal division, and 11th of 12 overall. ESPN predicted that UVA would be one of the only two ACC teams (alongside Wake Forest) to not achieve bowl eligibility.

Schedule

Personnel

Rankings

References

Virginia
Virginia Cavaliers football seasons
Virginia Cavaliers football